Walther Meienreis (4 November 1877 – 2 December 1943) was a German fencer. He competed in the individual épée and team sabre events at the 1912 Summer Olympics.

References

External links
 

1877 births
1943 deaths
German male fencers
Olympic fencers of Germany
Fencers at the 1912 Summer Olympics
Kriegsmarine personnel of World War II
20th-century German people